Além da Ilha ( Beyond the island) is a Brazilian comedy thriller web television series that premiered on Globoplay on September 6, 2018. Written by Andrea Batitucci and Rosana Hermann, the series is directed by César Rodrigues

Premise
After winning 200 million Brazilian Reals in a lottery bet, Beto (Paulo Gustavo), Guta (Katiúscia Canoro), Sheila (Monique alfradique), Bia (Letícia Lima) and Cardoso (Gabriel Godoy) decide to celebrate the conquest during a boat trip. As none of them know what it takes to navigate, the group ends up lost on a deserted and mysterious island.

Cast
 Paulo Gustavo	as	 Beto 
 Katiuscia Canoro as	 Guta 
 Monique Alfradique as	 Sheila 
 Letícia Lima	as	 Bia 
 Gabriel Godoy	as	 Cardoso 
 André Mattos	as	 Theodoro 
 Guilherme Piva	as	 Tobias 
 Paulo Roque	as	 Inácio 
 Anderson Lau	as	 Kenji Midoriya

References

External links

2018 Brazilian television series debuts
2010s Brazilian television series
Brazilian comedy television series
Globoplay original programming
Portuguese-language television shows